Central European cuisine consists of the culinary customs, traditions and cuisines of the nations of Central Europe.

The cuisines within each country in the region is strongly influenced by the local climate. For example, German, Polish, Austrian and Czech cuisines show many similarities, yet differ from the highlander cuisines in their respective countries, while in settlements closer to rivers or lakes, more fish and various seafood can be found more frequently. More mountainous areas near the Alps house dishes that contain cheese, milk and butter among other dairy products.

Roman Empire influence
During the Bronze Age and Iron Age the basic foods were pulses, wild fruits and nuts, and cereals. Archaeobotanical evidence has shown that a large number of new foodstuffs were introduced to Central Europe under Roman rule, becoming incorporated into (rather than replacing) local culinary flavors. Because chickpeas, gourd, black pepper, pistachio, almond, dates, olives, melons and rice were difficult to cultivate locally they remained imported luxuries, out of reach for most. Evidence has been found for dill, celery seeds and other seasonings at Bibracte and other excavation sites.

See also

 Ashkenazi cuisine
  Austrian cuisine
  Viennese cuisine
  Czech cuisine
  Moravian cuisine
  German cuisine
 Baden cuisine
  Bavarian cuisine
  Brandenburg cuisine
  Franconian cuisine
  Hamburger cuisine
  Hessian cuisine
  Lower Saxon cuisine
 Mecklenburg cuisine
 Palatine cuisine
 Pomeranian cuisine
  Saxon cuisine
 Ore Mountain cuisine
  Schleswig-Holstein cuisine
 Swabian cuisine
  Hungarian cuisine
  Polish cuisine
  Lublin cuisine
  Podlaskie cuisine
  Świętokrzyskie cuisine
  Liechtensteiner cuisine
  Silesian cuisine
  Slovak cuisine
  Slovenian cuisine
  Swiss cuisine

References

Metzger, Christine (ed.) Culinaria Germany. Cambridge: Ullmann, 2008.
Montanari, Massimo, Il mondo in cucina (The world in the kitchen). Laterza, 2002
Mintz, Sidney . Tasting Food, Tasting Freedom: Excursions into Eating, Power, and the Past, Beacon Press, 1997, 
Mintalová - Zubercová, Zora: Všetko okolo stola I.(All around the table I.), Vydavateľstvo Matice slovenskej, 2009, 

 
European cuisine